Lake Macatawa is a lake in Ottawa County in the U.S. state of Michigan.

Geography 

The lake occupies portions of Park Township, Holland Township, and the City of Holland.

The lake contains two bays of significant size: Big Bay, and the smaller Pine Creek Bay to the east.  The lake is the drowned river mouth of the Macatawa River (formerly known as the Black River), which feeds into the lake's eastern end in the City of Holland.  Other tributaries include Pine Creek, which feeds into Pine Creek Bay, and Winstrom Creek, which feeds into Big Bay.  The lake discharges into Lake Michigan at the U.S. Army Corps of Engineers channel near Holland State Park. The lake and its watershed encompass  of Ottawa and Allegan counties.

Industry 
The eastern end of the lake is marked by industrial development within the City of Holland, and includes a decommissioned coal-fired power plant, scrap metal recycling facility, environmental research facility owned by Michigan State University, aggregate mineral loading dock, and a pickle production facility owned by the H.J. Heinz company.  The remainder of the lakeshore is marked by high-income residential development, with the notable exception of Holland State Park which borders the northern shoreline of the western end of the lake, Howard B. Dunton park on the north shore of the eastern end, and Kollen Park near the Heinz factory, which connects to a boardwalk installed along the shoreline occupied by the facility.

See also
List of lakes in Michigan

References

External links
Michigan DNR map of Lake Macatawa

Macatawa
Bodies of water of Ottawa County, Michigan